Stone Creek Ranch is a gated community located in the western parts of Delray Beach, Florida, straddling the city's border with Boca Raton. The community of 37 homes is often featured in luxury magazines and is known for the notability of its residents. The community is developed by Kenco Communities, a luxury real estate developer in South Florida.

Description 
The community is accessible off of Lyons Road, and not too far from U.S. Route 441 and Florida's Turnpike. The community is circled by a ring road, Quiet Vista Circle, with four roads branching off of Quiet Vista Circle (Hawk Shadow Lane, Rockybrook Way, Bent Grass Court, and Jagged Creek Court). Two lakes lay within the community, a smaller one between Bent Grass and Jagged Creek, and a substantially larger one bordering many of the properties. Many homes within Stone Creek Ranch have outdoor tennis courts,

Some homes within Stone Creek Ranch have set local sales records and made national media. In 2021, CNBC journalist Ray Parsi covered a home known informally as the "Rockybrook Estate", which sold for around $19,000,000. The estate includes a theatre, bowling alley, winery, a 250,000-gallon swimming pool, and tennis courts. The YouTube video published by CNBC touring the Rockybrook Estate currently has over 1.1 million views.

Statistics 
Stone Creek Ranch lies entirely within zip code 33446, and estimates for the average price of a home within the community fall around $15 million to $26 million USD. Florida annual property taxes for the Rockybrook estate, among the most expensive homes in the community, are estimated to be around $178,000 USD.

Notable residents

Current 

 Steve Cohen, hedge fund manager and owner of the New York Mets
 Gerry Smith, CEO of The ODP Corporation

Former 

 Antonio Neri, CEO of Hewlett Packard Enterprise

References

External Links 

 Senada Adzem's Listing Website
 Matthew Aschler's Listing Website

Gated communities in Florida
Delray Beach, Florida